Košarkaški klub Bratunac, commonly referred to as KK Bratunac, is a men's professional basketball club based in Bratunac, Republika Srpska, Bosnia and Herzegovina. They are currently competing in the Bosnia and Herzegovina Championship.

History
The club was founded in 1974.

The club won the First League of Republika Srpska in the 2017–18 season and got promoted to Bosnia and Herzegovina Championship for the 2018–19 season.

Sponsorship naming
The club has had several denominations through the years due to its sponsorship:
 Vihor Bratunac (2008–2007)
 Bratunac MINS (2007–2009)
 Bratunac TRB (2019–2020)

Home arena
Bratunac plays its home games at the Bratunac Sports Hall. The hall is located in Bratunac and has a seating capacity of 1,200 seats.

Players

Head coaches 

  Milivoje Mađenović (2017–2018)
  Ognjen Radić (2018–present)

Trophies and awards
First League of Republika Srpska (2nd-tier)
Winners (1): 2017–18

References

External links
 Profile at eurobasket.com
 Profile at realgm.com

Bratunac
Bratunac
Bratunac
Bratunac
Bratunac